John Hawks may refer to:

John D. Hawks, American paleoanthropologist
John Twelve Hawks, American science fiction author
John Hawks (architect) (died 1790), British born architect in America
John Milton Hawks (1826–1910), abolitionist, surgeon and Florida settler

See also
John Hawk (disambiguation)
John Hawke (disambiguation)
John Hawkes (disambiguation)